Subotica City Stadium is a multi-purpose stadium located in Subotica, Serbia. With a capacity of 13,000 people, it is currently used mostly for football matches and is the home ground of FK Spartak Subotica from 1945. There is a football pitch and a registered track for athletics suitable for competitions. One part of the stadium is covered. There are also two subsidiary football pitches.

History
The stadium was built in 1936 and named "Stadion kralja Petra" (King Peter's Stadium), also known as "Sokolsko sletište" (Falcon's Landing Site). It was part of the major architectural project by Dr. Kosta Petrović named "Veliki narodni park" (Great People's Park) and meant to serve the city with all necessary structures for sports and entertainment. The initial capacity of the stadium was between 20 and 25,000 spectators. The stadium was inaugurated on 6 June 1936, for the "Sokolski slet", an event that gathered all the "Sokol" associations from the northern region of the Kingdom of Yugoslavia. The further development of the sports complex was interrupted with the beginning of the Second World War and never completed afterwards.

One of the main characteristics of the stadium is its rectangular shape. During the years it has gone through several renovations, in 1972, 1978, 2000, 2012 and 2018.

The stadium was host at the 1986 UEFA European Under-18 Championship.

Gallery

See also
 List of football stadiums in Serbia

References

Football venues in Serbia
Football venues in Serbia and Montenegro
Athletics (track and field) venues in Serbia and Montenegro
Football venues in Yugoslavia
Athletics (track and field) venues in Yugoslavia
Multi-purpose stadiums in Serbia
Sport in Subotica